Cyrtodactylus lateralis, also known as Werner's prehensile-tailed bent-toed gecko, the Sumatra bow-fingered gecko, or the spiny forest gecko, is a species of gecko that is endemic to Sumatra.

References 

Cyrtodactylus
Reptiles described in 1896